JAFAX is an annual three day anime convention held during June/July at the Amway Grand Plaza Hotel & DeVos Place in Grand Rapids, Michigan. The convention's full name stands for Japanese Animation Film and Art Expo. JAFAX was previously a two-day event held at Grand Valley State University in Allendale, Michigan and was organized by the university's anime club (Otaku No Anime) and tabletop gaming club (AltReal).

Programming
The convention typically offers anime screenings, an artist alley, dance, fashion shows, game shows, guest speakers, maid cafe, masquerade, music video contest, panel discussions, tabletop gaming, vendors, and video games.

Charity events in 2016 included the 100 Tables Project and a Blood Drive.

History
The event was started in 1995 by Rob Grimes, to spread anime in West Michigan. JAFAX for its first two years was held at the Kendall College of Art and Design, before moving to Grand Valley State University. No convention was held in 2015 due to outgrowing the space available at Grand Valley State University, the search for a new venue, and organizational changes. The event was free until moving in 2016 to the Amway Grand Plaza Hotel & DeVos Place. Registration experienced issues and the convention shared its hotel with several weddings. JAFAX 2020 and 2021 were  cancelled due to the COVID-19 pandemic.

Event history

References

External links
 JAFAX Website

Grand Valley State University
Anime conventions in the United States
Recurring events established in 1996
1996 establishments in Michigan
Annual events in Michigan
Festivals in Michigan
Tourist attractions in Grand Rapids, Michigan
Conventions in Michigan